Turia Vogel (born September 1, 1969) is a sailor who competes for the Cook Islands in windsurf events

Vogel competed at the 1996 Summer Olympics and 2000 Summer Olympics, she competed in the Mistral One Design both times, in 1996 she finished 22nd and four years later 20th.

References

External links
 

1963 births
Living people
Cook Island female sailors (sport)
Cook Island windsurfers
Sailors at the 1996 Summer Olympics – Mistral One Design
Sailors at the 2000 Summer Olympics – Mistral One Design
Olympic sailors of the Cook Islands
Female windsurfers